Tayanne Mantovaneli (born 14 February 1987) is a Brazilian group rhythmic gymnast. She represents her nation at international competitions. 

She participated at the 2004 Summer Olympics in Sydney and 2008 Summer Olympics in Beijing.
She also competed at world championships, including at the 2007  World Rhythmic Gymnastics Championships.

See also 
List of Olympic rhythmic gymnasts for Brazil

References

External links 

http://www.espn.com/extra/panam/results?sport=RGYMNASTICS
https://database.fig-gymnastics.com/public/gymnasts/biography/2130/true?backUrl=%2Fpublic%2Fresults%2Fdisplay%2F14883%3FidAgeCategory%3D8%26idCategory%3D78%23anchor_84476

1987 births
Living people
Brazilian rhythmic gymnasts
Place of birth missing (living people)
Gymnasts at the 2004 Summer Olympics
Olympic gymnasts of Brazil
Gymnasts at the 2008 Summer Olympics
Pan American Games medalists in gymnastics
Pan American Games gold medalists for Brazil
Pan American Games bronze medalists for Brazil
South American Games gold medalists for Brazil
South American Games bronze medalists for Brazil
South American Games medalists in gymnastics
Gymnasts at the 2003 Pan American Games
Gymnasts at the 2007 Pan American Games
Competitors at the 2002 South American Games
Competitors at the 2006 South American Games
Medalists at the 2003 Pan American Games
Medalists at the 2007 Pan American Games
20th-century Brazilian women
21st-century Brazilian women